Tylopilus variobrunneus is a bolete fungus in the family Boletaceae native to the United States. It was described as new to science in 1998.

See also
List of North American boletes

References

External links

variobrunneus
Fungi described in 1998
Fungi of the United States
Fungi without expected TNC conservation status